Vodafone UK is a British telecommunications services provider, and a part of Vodafone Group Plc, the world's second-largest mobile phone company. Vodafone is the third-largest mobile network operator in the United Kingdom, with 17.8 million subscribers as of February 2023, after O2 and EE, followed by Three.

Vodafone has been the longest running network in the country since its first cellular network call was made in January 1985. The company's current slogan since 2020 is “Together we can”, replacing the previous slogan "The future is exciting. Ready?". The current branding and logo was created in 2017.

History

Mobile network
In 1981, Racal Electronics Group won its bid for the private sector UK Cellular licence, and created Racal Telecomms Division. The same year, Racal formed a joint venture with Millicom named 'Racal Vodafone'. The Vodafone name was first unveiled on 22 March 1984. Vodafone made the first ever cellular telephone call in the United Kingdom on 1 January 1985, from St Katharine Docks to Newbury, and launched the UK's first cellular network later that year. 'Vodapage' was launched two years later, providing 80% of the United Kingdom's population with a paging service, and a service called 'Vodata' was also launched for voice and data.

Racal Telecom was demerged from Racal Electronics in 1991, becoming Vodafone Group, and introduced the country's first GSM mobile phone network the same year. The company launched digital data, fax and a text messaging service with Vodata in 1994. Vodafone also began working with Globalstar to develop and launch a satellite to provide a Satellite phone service.

On 5 January 1999, Vodafone UK connected its 5 millionth customer. By the end of 1999 it had 8 million customers, rising to 12 million in 2001,

The first 3G voice call in the UK was made in April 2001 on the Vodafone UK network, with an initial network of 30 base stations in the Thames Valley set for the commercial launch in 2002. That same month Vodafone launched GPRS services. Around the same time, Vodafone's analogue TACS network was closed after 16 years of service. In 2003, Vodafone introduced the 'Speaking Phone', a phone for blind & visually impaired users. Vodafone Mobile Connect 3G was launched in 2005, a data card that uses the network's 3G capabilities to connect laptop users to the internet.

Vodafone UK won Mobile Retailer's 'National Retailer of the Year' in 2005 and was awarded 'Best Network' in the 2010 Mobile News and Mobile Awards.

In May 2011, Vodafone and Justgiving launched 'JustTextGiving', which allows mobile phone user to donate between £1 and £10 to a registered charity using a SMS message, which is paid for by the donor through reverse SMS billing.  Vodafone invested £5 million to ensure that charities do not incur any set-up costs, or commissions deducted from donations, ensuring that they receive 100% of donations and Gift Aid.

Vodafone and O2 signed a deal in June 2012 which will see the two companies 'pool' their network technology, creating a single national grid of 18,500 transmitter sites. Both networks will continue to carry their own independent mobile spectrum.

On 20 February 2013, Ofcom announced that Vodafone had been awarded spectrum in the 800 MHz and 2.6 GHz bands for 4G LTE coverage, bidding around £790 million for the spectrum. The service became available to customers in London on 29 August, and will expand to a further twelve cities by the end of 2013.

On 29 March 2018, following the release of iOS 11.3, Vodafone launched VoLTE (4G Calling) for iPhone users, with devices from the iPhone 6S to the iPhone X being compatible. The feature had been active on some Android phones from Huawei, Samsung Mobile and Sony Mobile prior to its launch on Apple Inc. devices.

On 3 July 2019, Vodafone launched their 5G network in Birmingham, Bristol, Cardiff, Glasgow, Manchester, Liverpool and London, with more towns and cities launching throughout 2019.

Fixed network
On 1 April 2012, Vodafone agreed a takeover of Cable & Wireless Worldwide at a cost of just over £1 billion. The acquisition gave Vodafone access to its own fixed line network, in addition to the already established mobile network, allowing the company to begin work on launching a variety of fixed line services to Enterprise customers in addition to the ex-CWW customers which it acquired during the initial takeover.

Following the acquisition of CWW, Vodafone began working on a consumer Broadband and TV proposition, using its fibre network. Vodafone launched its broadband offering to the UK public on 12 October 2015. Work is ongoing for the launch of Vodafone's UK TV service, which the company originally planned to launch before the spring of 2016, however has since delayed to a later date.

Radio frequency summary

Vodafone LTE 1800 MHz is only available in some areas, having been refarmed from 2G (1800 MHz), whereas the LTE 2100 MHz is available in a rapidly increasing number of areas and is very potent in areas such as Cardiff, London, Manchester and Birmingham.

Marketing

Stores
Vodafone operates a retail estate consisting of both company owned and franchise (known as Partner Agent) stores. In total, there are more than 400 stores located across the UK.

A 'Tech Team' section (similar to Apple's Genius Bar) was rolled out in November 2011 to Vodafone 'Elite' status Stores in cities & large towns, offering free advice to all customers of the mobile network. Vodafone also introduced the 'RED Box' to its stores at the same time, which allows phone users to transfer contents between handsets.

Vodafone VIP

Beginning in 2010, Vodafone UK operated a 'VIP' reward scheme as part of a partnership with Live Nation, in which customers could access tickets 48 hours before release for major UK events including T in the Park, Isle of Wight Festival, Reading & Leeds festival, London Fashion Week and the British Grand Prix. Some of the music festivals involved in the scheme had their own 'Vodafone VIP' areas, available to customers by winning certain competitions. In May 2013, the Vodafone VIP Mobile Application developed by Invitation Digital was launched on both iPhone and Android platforms.
In January 2014, Vodafone announced the closure of Vodafone VIP with immediate effect.

Freebee Rewardz

Vodafone UK launched a loyalty scheme named 'Freebee Rewardz' in late 2011, accompanied by a £3million marketing campaign featuring two CGI bees named Jack and Mike voiced by Dan Antopolski and Karl Theobald. Each time a pay-as-you-go customer top-up £15 (such as a discount on a film from Blockbuster, or free credit toward their balance) to collect 'Pointz' that can be added to their bigger prize. 
 In May 2015 Rewardz were renamed Rewards to reflect marketing  changes

30 Day Service Guarantee and Flexi-Upgrade

In 2017 Vodafone UK launched two new features one called 30-day network satisfaction for new and upgrading customers that if they aren't happy with the Vodafone service and coverage within the first 30 days of having the contract the user can cancel and leave the network, the other is called Flexi-Upgrades this allows Vodafone customers after 6 months of being in their current contract to upgrade to a new device and contract after paying a certain amount off of their contract/device plans.

In June 2018 the 30-day Network Satisfaction was renamed and readvertised as the 30-day Service Guarantee, however in July 2019 the 30-day return period was removed by Vodafone and has now been reduced to only 14-days.

Slogans

Vodafone used the slogan 'How are you?' in the UK between 2003 and 2006, but briefly switched in 2007 to "Make the Most of Now". In 2009 they switched to the international 'Power to you' branding, which the company used for 8 years.

On 6 October 2017, Vodafone unveiled a new global brand campaign. This saw the iconic logo return to its former 2D appearance and the introduction of their new slogan "The future is exciting... Ready?"

The Official Vodafone Big Top 40

From November 2010, Vodafone had used commercial radio's syndicated chart show to advertise its products and offers. Sunday evenings between 4 & 7, produced at London's Capital FM and syndicated to some of the biggest local radio stations in the UK, the show was hosted by Marvin Humes & Kat Shoob.

For the first 12 months of their sponsorship, Vodafone pushed their 'Freebees' brand and the show was named 'The Vodafone Freebees Big Top 40 Show' before being changed to simply 'The Vodafone Big Top 40' in 2011.

In 2017, the show was named 'The Official Vodafone Big Top 40' and the logo was re-made to fit the colours of Vodafone's new subsidiary mobile network, VOXI.

In March 2022, the show gained a new sponsor and was renamed The Sky VIP Official Big Top 40.

Be Unlimited
On 10 July 2019, Vodafone launched their new ad campaign "Be Unlimited" to accompany the launch of their new Unlimited Data plans which include 4G and 5G network coverage.

Controversies

Data charges

Vodafone UK came under criticism in June 2011 after they scrapped their fair-use policy on data charges, meaning those without monthly allowances would pay 50p for every 10MB of data used.

Loss of network

A break-in at the Vodafone exchange centre in Basingstoke on 28 February 2011 left several hundreds of thousands of customers in the west of London without network access, after burglars stole computer equipment and damaged network hardware.

Subcontracting to third-parties

Vodafone came under fire after the Manchester Arena bombing of May 2017. The company outsourced the  National Mutual Aid Telephony system out to a third party under the name of Content Guru. When the attack took place, the system failed to operate and resulted in those affected by the attack not being able to contact police or emergency services.

VOXI by Vodafone
On 9 September 2017, Vodafone launched their VOXI SIM-only plans which offered users under 25 unlimited minutes, texts and endless data to social media websites and apps. In 2018 the upper age limit was raised to 30. As of November 2018, Voxi has started selling contracted and SIM-free phones. In April 2019 the upper age limit was removed by Vodafone meaning that VOXI is now available to all users regardless of their age.

VOXI users gained access to Vodafone's 5G services in October 2019 however access was limited to users on the unlimited plan only. Users of lower prices plans gained access to the new technology in September 2020 along with unlimited video streaming.

References

External links
 

Vodafone
Mobile phone companies of the United Kingdom
Telecommunications companies established in 1985
Companies based in Newbury, Berkshire
1985 establishments in England